Pakistan Air Force college  Lower Topa is an all-boys military boarding school situated at PAF Base, Lower Topa, which is located near Patriata in the Murree region of the Murree District of Pakistan. Placed on a mountain hilltop, the institution is made up of a series of buildings. These comprise the boarding lodgings, academic blocks, hobbies section, laboratories, administration, library, hospital, etc. The other buildings consist of a mosque, a general purpose hall, an auditorium and a messing block . It is considered as elite boarding institution of Pakistan providing quality education and training. The public school serves as a nursery for the future leadership of the Pakistan Air Force. A new academic block has just been completed in 2010. Admission is open for all Pakistani students, however, one Bangladeshi student is admitted in the school.

Aims and objectives

The primary aim of PAF Public School Lower Topa is to educate and groom boys for intermediate examination of Federal Board. The mission is accomplished in a healthy environment. The effort is to mould the new entrants into confident and disciplined young men with a strong character and qualities of command and leadership, so that they become future officers of the Pakistan Air Force.

School administration

The school is run under a Principal. Additional administrative hierarchy includes a Vice Principal, an Adjutant, an Officer in-charge of the Progress Section (the Academic, Student Performance & Administration Wing), two Heads of department, Six House masters, and an equivalent number of Assistant House masters to manage the administrative matters of the school. The current School Administration is led by:

Principal: Air Vice Marshall (Rtd.) Khalid Dabbir HI(M)

Vice-Principal: Gp Capt Humayun Khattak

HoD (Sciences): Sqn Ldr Farrukh Khan

HoD (Humanities): Mr.Tariq Anees

Adjutant Sqn Ldr Saima Habib

Student Command System

There are six houses, each led by a house captain selected from the senior most entry. They are responsible for the house discipline and are answerable to the school head boy. Other school appointments include 1 College Prefect and 2 House Prefects for each house.

First three Head Boy of School were

1. Pre-Cadet Ammar Ali Zeb

2. Pre-Cadet Talha Yousaf

3. Pre-Cadet Ammar Iqbal

Academics
The students are prepared for the FBISE. The following subjects are taught:

(a) Secondary School Certificate Examination: English, Urdu, Islamiat, Pakistan Studies, Mathematics, Physics, Chemistry and Computer Science. 
(b) Intermediate Examination (Pre-Engineering Group): English, Urdu, Islamic Studies, Pakistan Studies, Mathematics, Physics and Chemistry.
The students from Bangladesh study geography of Pakistan instead of Urdu.

Achievements

The school holds a record of maintaining highest grade point average every year since its re-induction in the FBISE.
There are also excellence and distinction badges for high achiever pre-cadets in academics.

Routine and activities
Daily  Schedule

The daily schedule is drawn up with a view to making optimum utilization of time. The routine program strives to ensure that adequate time is provided for the development of all facets of a student's personality and abilities. As such equal stress is laid on academic as well as spiritual, moral, intellectual and physical activities.

Commemoration of National Days

All important national days such as Independence Day, Quaid-e-Azam’s Birthday, Iqbal Day, Defence Day and Air Force Day are commemorated by holding meetings in which the entire student body participates.

Facilities and miscellaneous
The all mentioned facilities are free of cost by Pakistan Air Force,however a fee of Rs.4500 is received on 6 month basis.monthly pocket money is returned.
Medical

For round-the-clock medical care, the school has a hospital headed by a qualified doctor with the necessary staff to assist him.

Uniform

While at the school, students have to be in the prescribed dress.  They are not permitted to wear private clothes.  The uniforms are provided to the students by the school.  Any willful damage to the uniforms is charged to the parents.  On initial joining, students are required to be in possession of clothing items as given in the joining instructions for the selected students.  These clothes should be worn by the students prior to the issue of the School uniform.

College Mess

The mess is under the supervision of the president Mess Committee who is assisted by the Mess Secretary and the Food Member.  Students are also associated with the management of the mess.  One representative from each house is a member of Mess Committee which would meet regularly to draw up the menu and discuss ways and means of improving the food.

The Mess Committee meeting is presided over by the Principal.  Meals include breakfast, lunch, evening tea or cold drinks and dinner.  However, there is no provision for extra messing.

Allied Facilities

Support facilities include MI Room, Canteen, Barber Shop, Cobbler Shop and a tailor shop.

Notable alumni

Lt Gen Moinuddin Haider, former Governor of Sindh, Federal Interior Minister, and Commander IV Corps, Lahore
Air Marshal Hifazat Ullah Khan, former Vice Chief of Air Staff (VCAS), PAF
AVM Khudadad Khan, former Add.DG National Accountability Bureau and former President Inter Services Selection Board Kohat
Sikandar Raza, Pakistani-born Zimbabwean cricketer

References

External links
Official Website

Boarding schools in Pakistan
Education in Murree
Universities and colleges in Murree
Buildings and structures in Murree
Schools in Murree
Pakistan Air Force cadet colleges
Educational institutions established in 1952
1952 establishments in Pakistan